David R. Clark, Q.C. is a Progressive Conservative Canadian politician.  He was elected in 1982 as the Member for the Legislative Assembly of New Brunswick for the Fredericton South provincial electoral district, serving in that role until 1987. He was appointed to Cabinet in 1985 and served as Minister of Justice and Attorney-General from 1985 - 1987.

References
Canadian Parliamentary Guide, 1987, PG Normandin

Progressive Conservative Party of New Brunswick MLAs
Living people
Year of birth missing (living people)